Ehsanabad (also Romanized as Eḩsānābād; also known as Anqūrtī) is a village in Sangar Rural District, in the Central District of Faruj County, North Khorasan Province, Iran. At the 2006 census, its population was 224, in 50 families.

References 

Populated places in Faruj County